Jeremiah Nanai (born 18 February 2003) is an Australia international rugby league footballer who plays as a  forward for the North Queensland Cowboys in the NRL.

He has played at representative level for Queensland in State of Origin.

Background 
Nanai was born in Auckland, New Zealand and raised in Cairns, Queensland, Australia. He is of Samoan descent.

He began playing rugby league at age 13 for the Cairns Kangaroos and attended Trinity Bay State High School, where he was selected for the Australian Schoolboys under-15 merit side in 2018.

In 2019, Nanai signed with the North Queensland Cowboys and moved to Townsville, Queensland, where he attended Kirwan State High School.

Playing career

Early career
In July 2019, Nanai represented the Northern Marlins at the QRL Under-16 Junior State Championships. On 29 September 2019, he represented Queensland Country under-16, scoring a hat trick and being named Man of the Match in their 44–4 win over Queensland City under-16.

In January 2020, Nanai was selected in the Queensland Under-18 Emerging Origin squad. In September 2020, Nanai played for Kirwan in their Queensland state final win over Palm Beach Currumbin State High School, scoring two tries.

On 7 October 2020, Nanai joined North Queensland's NRL squad on a development contract for the 2021 season.

2021
Nanai began the 2021 season playing for the Northern Pride in the Queensland Cup.

In Round 22 of the 2021 NRL season, Nanai made his NRL debut against the Wests Tigers.

2022
In round 3 of the 2022 NRL season, Nanai scored a hat-trick for North Queensland against arch rivals Brisbane in a 38–12 victory.

In April, Nanai signed a one-year contract extension to remain at North Queensland until the end of 2023.

In round 7, Nanai was sent to the sin bin and later scored a try during North Queensland's 30–4 victory over the Gold Coast.

In round 11, Nanai scored two tries for North Queensland in their shock 36–6 upset victory over Melbourne.

On 30 May, Nanai was selected to debut for the Queensland State of Origin team for game one of the 2022 State of Origin series.  Nanai was taken from the field during Queensland's 16–10 victory with an ankle injury.

In round 20, Nanai scored two tries for North Queensland in a 34–8 victory over St. George Illawarra.

Nanai finished a great year receiving the Dally M Rookie of the Year award and the Dally M Second Rower of the year and finishing the season with 17 tries from 23 matches.

In October he was named in the Australia squad for the 2021 Rugby League World Cup.

2023
In round 2 of the 2023 NRL season, Nanai scored two tries for North Queensland in their 28-16 loss against arch-rivals Brisbane.

References

External links 

North Queensland Cowboys profile

2003 births
Living people
Australia national rugby league team players
New Zealand rugby league players
New Zealand sportspeople of Samoan descent
North Queensland Cowboys players
Queensland Rugby League State of Origin players
Northern Pride RLFC players
Rugby league players from Auckland
Rugby league second-rows